The 2013–14 Saint Francis Red Flash men's basketball team represented Saint Francis University during the 2013–14 NCAA Division I men's basketball season. The Red Flash, led by second year head coach Rob Krimmel, played their home games at the DeGol Arena and were members of the Northeast Conference. They finished the season 10–21, 7–9 in NEC play to finish in a tie for sixth place. They advanced to the semifinals of the NEC tournament where they lost to Robert Morris.

Roster

Schedule

|-
!colspan=9 style="background:#990000; color:#FFFFFF;"| Regular season

|-
!colspan=9 style="background:#990000; color:#FFFFFF;"| 2014 Northeast Conference tournament

References

Saint Francis Red Flash men's basketball seasons
Saint Francis (PA)